Potential Getaway Driver is an independent record label that began in the winter of 2005. It was originally based between Flint, Michigan and Saginaw, Michigan and is now based between Flint and Chicago.

The label's name is a reference from the film Bottle Rocket.

Roster
 Anathallo
 The Conqueror Worm
 Javelins
 Lingua Franca
 Our Space In Time
 Tristeza

See also 
 List of record labels

External links
 Official site

American independent record labels
Record labels established in 2005
Indie rock record labels
Alternative rock record labels